Northampton Saints (officially Northampton Rugby Football Club) is a professional rugby union club from Northampton, England. They play in Premiership Rugby, England's top division of rugby.

They were formed in 1880 as "Northampton St. James", which gave them the nickname Saints from the 1880s. The team play their home games at Franklin's Gardens, in the west of the town, which has a capacity of 15,250 and play in black, green, and gold colours.

At the conclusion of the 2021–22 Premiership Rugby season, Saints finished 4th which entitled them to compete in the 2022–23 European Rugby Champions Cup.  The current director of rugby is Phil Dowson, who was promoted to director of rugby in the summer of 2022.

Northampton has won six major titles. They were European Champions in 2000 and English Champions in 2014. They have also won the secondary European Rugby Challenge Cup twice, in 2009 and 2014, the Anglo Welsh Cup in 2010, and, most recently, the inaugural Premiership Rugby Cup in 2019. They have also won the Second Division title three times; in 1990, 1996 and 2008.

Their biggest rivals are Leicester Tigers. "The East Midlands Derby" is one of the fiercest rivalries in English rugby union.

History

Early years

The club was established in 1880 under the original title of Northampton St. James (Saints) by Rev Samuel Wathen Wigg, a local clergyman and curate of St. James Church who was a resident of the nearby village of Milton Malsor in the house known as "Mortimers". This is how the club got its two nicknames of "The Saints" or "Jimmies". His original concept was to promote "order" to his younger parish members by creating a youth rugby club, with the philosophy of a "hooligan sport designed to turn them into gentlemen".

It was not long before Northampton had one of the major rugby union teams in the country. Twenty years after its establishment, the first Saints player, local farmer Harry Weston, was awarded an England cap.

As the club progressed through the early years of the 20th century one player dominated this era for the club, Edgar Mobbs. Edgar was a hero throughout the town. He was the first Northampton player to captain his country but is best remembered for his exploits in World War I. After initially being turned down as too old, Edgar raised his own "Sportsman's" battalion otherwise known as Mobbs Own. Edgar was killed in battle, leading his battalion over the top by kicking a rugby ball into no man's land on 29 July 1917 attacking a machine gun post and his body was never found. The club arranged the Mobbs Memorial Match as a tribute. It had been played every year since 1921 and the fixture took place between the Barbarians and East Midlands at Franklin's Gardens until the Barbarians withdrew their support in 2008. The match was saved by the efforts of former Northampton player Bob Taylor and former Northampton chairman Keith Barwell, and since 2012 it has been played alternately at Bedford Blues' Goldington Road ground and Franklin's Gardens, with the host club facing the British Army team.

In this postwar period the Saints continued to grow, and they started to produce some of the best players in England, some of whom went on to captain their country. They were one of the driving forces in the English game for the next 60 years producing players such as Butterfield, Jeeps, Longland, White and Jacobs but hard times were ahead.

The club failed to keep pace with movements within the game and top players were no longer attracted to the Gardens, where a 'them and us' mentality had built up between the players and those in charge of the club. Some former players formed their own task force which swept out the old brigade in the 1988 'Saints Revolution' and put a plan into action which would put the club back at the top of the English game.

Barry Corless, as director of rugby, set about restructuring the club and soon the Saints were back on the way up, helped by the signing of All Blacks legend Buck Shelford.

In 1990, Northampton Rugby Union Football Club gained promotion to the First Division and the following year made their first trip to Twickenham to play Quins in the Pilkington Cup Final. They lost in extra time but the foundations of a good Saints line-up were beginning to show in the following few seasons.

Tim Rodber and Ian Hunter forced their way into the England setup while younger players such as Paul Grayson, Matt Dawson and Nick Beal came through the ranks and would follow the duo into the England senior team.

In 1994, Ian McGeechan took over as director of rugby, and although the club were relegated in his first season, they returned in style the next season, winning every single game of their campaign and averaging 50 points a game. This season is referred to by many fans of the club as the "Demolition Tour of Division Two".

Professional era
In 1995, rugby union turned professional and the club was taken over by local businessman Keith Barwell.

In 1999, Saints came runners-up in the Allied Dunbar Premiership, their league campaign climaxing with a crucial home local derby with eventual winners Leicester Tigers which they lost 15–22. Ian McGeechan had left the club at the end of the previous season to return to coach Scotland, and was replaced by former Saints player John Steele who had done well on a limited budget at London Scottish.  Steele relied on the foundations laid by McGeechan, as well as the inspirational captaincy of Samoan Pat Lam to lead the club to European success the following season.

In 1999–2000, the club became a Public Limited Company (Plc) and shares were issued to the public; in this season the Saints lost in the Tetley's Bitter Cup Final to Wasps, but beat Munster 9–8 in the European Cup Final to win their first major trophy.

After a poor start to the 2001/2002 season, former All-Black coach Wayne Smith was appointed as head coach. He went on to transform the club in five short months. A team who looked down and out in November were moulded into a side that reached the Powergen Cup final and again qualified for the Heineken Cup. Travis Perkins became the club's main sponsor in 2001.

In recent times the club narrowly survived relegation from the Premiership, after the coach (Alan Solomons) was sacked in the middle of the 2004–05 season.  The coaching role was passed onto the former first teammates Budge Pountney and Paul Grayson to tide the team over. They had a slow start in the 2005–06 season, but continued to stay mainly unbeaten after the New Year. Budge retired at the start of the 2006–07 season leaving Grayson in overall control.

The Saints would again compete in the 2006–07 Heineken Cup. They finished second in their pool, behind Biarritz Olympique, the runners-up from the previous season. Northampton qualified for the quarter-finals and actually met Biarritz in Spain. Despite being in last place of the English league at the time, they defeated the French champions 7–6 to advance to the semi-finals.

Relegation (2007–08)
On 28 April 2007, despite a 27–22 victory over London Irish at Franklin's Gardens, Northampton were relegated from the English Premiership. A "behind the scenes restructure" led to the brief appointment of Peter Sloane as head coach, from the role of forwards coach. Paul Grayson became the skills and backs coach. England Saxons coach Jim Mallinder became the new head coach and director of rugby, with his assistant Dorian West also following as assistant coach. Peter Sloane has since left the club.

On 22 March 2008, Northampton beat Exeter Chiefs to ensure their promotion and a return to the Guinness Premiership. On 12 April 2008, Northampton beat Exeter Chiefs 24–13 at Twickenham Stadium to win the EDF Energy Trophy. On 26 April 2008 they ended their National Division One season undefeated with 30 wins from 30 games.

Return to Premiership (2008–2014)
In the 2008–09 season, the Saints finished eighth on the table and only losing one game at home to Newcastle Falcons. They also lifted the European Challenge Cup, defeating French side Bourgoin 15–3 in the final on 22 May 2009 at The Stoop in London. The victory gave them a place in the 2009–10 Heineken Cup.

In March 2010, the Saints won the Anglo-Welsh Cup final against Gloucester 30–24, gaining them their fourth piece of silverware in three years, and a place in the following season's Heineken Cup.  They also finished second in the English Premiership, losing to Saracens 19–21 in the semi-final played at Franklin's Gardens, and progressed as far as the quarter-finals of the Heineken Cup losing to Munster at Thomond Park, Limerick.

Northampton finished fourth in the 2010–11 English Premiership, losing to Leicester in the semi-final. Saints also went undefeated into the final of the Heineken Cup, where they were beaten by Leinster 33–22, at the Millennium Stadium.

At the beginning of the 2011–12 season, with nine players out for the 2011 Rugby World Cup in New Zealand, Saints were knocked out of the 2011–12 Heineken Cup in Stadium MK by Munster. When the international players returned, Saints began to move up the table. England picked eight Saints players out of a squad of 32 to represent England, meaning that over a quarter of the England team were Saints – a new club record for the number of players selected for a single England squad. In 2011–12, the Saints reached a third successive Premiership semi-final and a second Anglo-Welsh Cup final in three seasons.

After winning their first five matches of 2012–13, the Saints were pulled back into the pack in the Premiership and exited both the Anglo-Welsh and Heineken Cups, despite ending Ulster's four-year unbeaten home European record just before Christmas 2012. The team finished fourth in the league, and after beating Saracens in the semi-final reached their first ever Premiership final, where they lost 37–17 to Leicester.
The 2013 season finished with seven players being taken to Argentina as part of the England squad, including Tom Wood as captain.

In the 2013–14 season, the club finished second in the league behind Saracens with a total of 78 points. Despite finishing second in the table, they went on to win the 2013–14 English Premiership, defeating table-topping Saracens 24–20, after 100 minutes of rugby due to the game going to extra time. They also reached the final of the 2013–14 European Challenge Cup, which they won by beating Bath 16–30, with the match being played at Cardiff Arms Park in Wales.

2014–2018
Following the most arguably successful season in the club's history, the Saints finished atop of the Rugby Premiership with 76 points. However, they were undone in the 2014–15 Premiership Rugby semi-finals, losing out 24–29 to Saracens on 23 May 2015.

After this, a couple disappointing seasons followed, with on-pitch results leading to a stagnation of the club overall, and on 12 December 2017, largely successful director of rugby Jim Mallinder was ultimately released from the club as a result after spending more than 10 years at the club. On 29 December 2017, Australian coach Alan Gaffney joined the club on an interim basis until the end of the 2017–18 Premiership Rugby campaign, who worked alongside Alan Dickens at the helm. The team finished 9th overall that year with a points tally of 43, but ultimately avoided relegation and confirmed their place in the 2018–19 Premiership Rugby season.

2018–current

A new era was confirmed at the club, when it was announced on 29 January 2018, that Hurricanes boss Chris Boyd would link up with the Saints for the 2018–19 Premiership Rugby campaign. The announcement of Boyd was a huge coup for the club, due to the coach's high level profile, and success in Southern Hemisphere Rugby, which included the 2016 Super Rugby title with the Hurricanes. In Boyd's first season at the club, the Northampton Saints would go on to lift the Premiership Rugby Cup, by defeating Saracens 23–9 in front of a home-final crowd, which took place on 17 March 2019. The Saints also secured a top 4 finish for the first time since 2015, and Boyd's men would go on to face the Exeter Chiefs in the Premiership Rugby semi-final play-off system.

Stadium

Franklin's Gardens

Northampton Saints have played at Franklin's Gardens since 1880, when the club was founded. Franklin's Gardens is a purpose-built rugby stadium near the town centre. It is about 1,250 m from the railway station and about 2,000 m from the bus station. The stadium holds approximately 15,250 people. The stadium also has 40 corporate boxes. Each can hold from 8 to 24 people. The four stands are: The Carlsberg Stand; Cinch Stand; Church's Stand; and the new Barwell Stand (which replaced the Sturtridge Pavilion). It is also a multi-functional conference centre as well as the only Aviva Premiership ground with its own cenotaph.

In 2009, the Saints' board announced they would be applying to increase capacity to 17,000 with the redevelopment of the North Stand. It was intended this would be funded by a £40 million investment by supermarket chain Asda, who would build a new store on the land currently used as training pitches. A political battle ensued with the local council, which later came to be seen as an attempt by the board to wrest public funding and public land for their commercial objectives.

The club has since secured funding through alternate means – a loan thought to be in the region of £5million through Northampton Borough Council – and with planning permission rubber-stamped, building will commence in the summer of 2015. The stand, which will take the name of the Barwell family, is due to be completed in time for the start of the 2015–16 Premiership Rugby season, and will take the capacity at Franklin's Gardens up to 15,249.

Northampton Saints had an unbeaten home record that stretched from March 2007 to March 2009, much of this record was set during the Saints' 2007/08 promotion from the RFU Championship (previously National Division One). During the 2008/09 English Premiership regular season the Saints only lost at Franklin's Gardens on one occasion, to the Newcastle Falcons.

The club's Barwell Stand was finished in October 2015 and debuted against Saracens on 7 November 2015.

In September 2021, Northampton Saints announced a six-year sponsorship deal with online car dealership cinch which including naming rights to Franklin's Gardens. The stadium immediately became cinch stadium at Franklin's Gardens and cinch would become the club's principal sponsor from 2022 to 2023 season.

Stadium MK

The club played a 2011 Heineken Cup quarter final match against Ulster at Stadium MK in Milton Keynes, because Franklin's Gardens was too small to meet the minimum 15,000 seats demanded by the European Rugby Cup tournament organisers. The Saints won the match, beating Ulster 23–13, witnessed by a crowd of over 21,000.  The Saints also played their semi-final there the same year, beating Perpignan 23–7. The Saints then hosted one Premiership
match a season at the stadium between 2014–15 and 2016–17; most recently, an Easter Sunday match against Saracens on 16 April 2017, narrowly losing 25–27.

Kits
In 2008, after being promoted from the championship to the premiership, Saints changed from Kooga to Rhino. After two years with Rhino, and coming second in the table, Saints switched again to Burrda Sport, a Swiss sports apparel company. Northampton signed a four-year deal with Burrda which have brought back the old-fashioned ring but with a modern twist for the home shirt and the away shirt with its black and gold ring with a peppermint light green background. In the 2014/15 season Burrda released a kit with horizontal green, black and gold stripes of the same size. It was one of the most popular kit releases of Saints History. Starting in the 2016/17 season Macron are Saints' kit supplier, signing a 10-year deal with the club.
For the 2021–2022 season the club released an away shirt with the names of the season-ticket holders that had donated their ticket to the club  because of the coronavirus.

Current kit
The kit is supplied by Macron. On the front of the shirt, Toolstation is at the centre while Elite Insurance Company appears on the top left while StubHub appears on the left and right of the collar. Hankook appears on the left sleeve. On the back of the shirt, Kubota appears at the top while GRS appears on top of the squad number while The University of Northampton appears on the bottom; Carlsberg on the match day shorts.

Rivalries
Saints' main rivals are Leicester Tigers, whom they face in the East Midlands Derby. Over a number of recent years, the Saints have developed a rivalry with Saracens, largely due to the increased number of fixtures the two teams have performed against one another in, the most notable fixture being the 2013–14 Premiership Rugby Final, in which the Saints ran out victors. Since Wasps relocation to the Ricoh Arena in Coventry, the two teams now also possess a form of local rivalry with one another.

Club honours & achievements

Northampton Saints
Premiership Rugby
Champions: (1) 2013–14
Runners–Up: (2) 1998–99, 2012–13
RFU Championship
Champions: (3) 1989–90, 1995–96, 2007–08
European Rugby Champions Cup
Champions: (1) 1999–00
Runners–Up: (1) 2010–11
European Challenge Cup
Champions: (2) 2008–09, 2013–14
Anglo-Welsh Cup
Champions: (1) 2009–10
Runners–Up: (6) 1990–91, 1999–00, 2001–02, 2002–03, 2011–12, 2013–14
Premiership Rugby Cup
Champions: (1) 2018–19
EDF Energy Trophy
Champions: (1) 2007–08
Selkirk Sevens
Champions: (2) 1991, 1993
Middlesex Sevens
Champions: (1) 2003

Northampton Wanderers (Reserves)
Premiership Rugby Shield
Champions: (3) 2008–09, 2016–17, 2017–18
Runners–Up: (4) 2003–04, 2007–08, 2013–14, 2015–16

Current squad

The Northampton Saints squad for the 2022–23 season is:

Academy squad

Club staff

First team coaching
Chris Boyd – consultant
Matt Ferguson – assistant/scrum coach
Ian Vass – defence coach 
Sam Vesty – head/attack coach
Phil Dowson – director of rugby

Academy
Mark Hopley – academy head coach
Jake Sharp – academy skills coach
Alex O'Dowd – academy programme manager
Will Parkin – junior academy manager
James Craig – DPP manager

Notable former players

Rugby World Cup
The following are players which have represented their countries at the Rugby World Cup, whilst playing for Northampton:

British and Irish Lions
The following players have toured with the British & Irish Lions while members of the club, other players have been selected but did not tour due to either injury, suspension or other reasons:

 Blair Swannell (1899 & 1904)
 Robin Harrison (1910)
 William Henry Weston (1936)
 Jeff Butterfield (1955 & 1959)
 Dickie Jeeps (1955, 1959 & 1962)
 Frank Sykes (1955)
 Keith Savage (1966 & 1968)
 David Powell (1966)
 Bob Taylor (1968)
 Peter Larter (1968)
 Bryan West (1968)
 Ian Hunter (1993)
 Martin Bayfield (1993)
 Matt Dawson (1997 & 2001)
 Tim Rodber (1997)
 Nick Beal (1997)
 Gregor Townsend (1997)
 Paul Grayson (1997)
 Ben Cohen (2001)
 Steve Thompson (2005)
 Euan Murray (2009)
 Courtney Lawes (2017 & 2021)
 George North (2017)
Dan Biggar (2021)

Hall of Fame
The history of Northampton Saints is one filled with illustrious names. To recognise and honour its best players, the club established its Hall of Fame in 2004. To date 21 players have been inducted:

Captains

 1880–81 F Barker
 1882 A Timms
 1883 T Racer
 1884 E Eyles
 1885–86 C Stanley
 1887 T Stanley
 1888 E S Dunkley
 1889 C Stanley
 1890 A E Orton
 1891 C Stanley
 1892–93 A E Orton
 1894–95 C H Davis
 1896 K H Kingston
 1897 C H Davis
 1898 K H Kingston
 1899 H B Kingston
 1900–01 W H Kingston
 1902 H T F Weston
 1903–04 H E Kingston
 1905 R West
 1906 E C Palmer
 1907 J H Miles
 1908–13 E R Mobbs
 1914 E C Cook
 1920–22 A G Bull
 1923 C P Tebbitt
 1924 A G Bull
 1925 R Vaughan
 1926 A F Blakiston
 1927 R Jones
 1928 J B Merry
 1929–30 W H Weston
 1931 E Coley
 1932 T Harris
 1933–34 W H Weston
 1935 A D Matthews
 1936 R J Longland
 1937 T Harris
 1938 W H Weston
 1939–41 G S Sturtridge
 1943–46 A P Bell
 1947 R Longland
 1948 R W Hamp
 1949 E R Knapp
 1950–54 D R White
 1955 M J Berridge
 1956–57 D R White
 1958 R E G Jeeps
 1959–61 C R Jacobs
 1962–63 P J Taylor
 1964 A R Turnell
 1965–66 C R Jacobs
 1967 R B Taylor
 1968–72 D L Powell
 1973–74 M J Roper
 1975–76 I D Wright
 1977 J J Page
 1978 P Johnson
 1979–80 P Sweet
 1981–82 P McGuckian
 1983 V Cannon
 1984 J A G D Raphael
 1985–86 D R Woodrow
 1987 G J Poole
 1988 G Steele-Bodger
 1989–91 G Pearce
 1992–93 C J Olver
 1994–99 T A K Rodber
 1999–2001 P R Lam
 2001 A C Pountney
 2002–04 A C Pountney and J Leslie
 2004 C Krige until November then S G Thompson
 2005 S G Thompson and T B Reihana
 2006–09 T B Reihana
 2009–14 D M Hartley
 2015 L Dickson
 2016 T Wood
 2017–18 D M Hartley
 2018–19 A Waller and D M Hartley
 2019-20 A Waller and T Harrison
 2020- A Waller and L Ludlam

Statistics

Overall stats
 Most Points in a match: 111 (v Timișoara Saracens 2019)
 Most Tries in a match: 17 (v Timișoara Saracens 2019)
 Most Conversions in a match: 13 (v Sedgley Park 2008) and (v Timișoara Saracens 2019)
 Most Penalty Goals in a match: 7 (v Richmond 1997)
 Most Drop Goals in a match: 2 (v Newcastle Falcons 1996)

Seasons summary

 
Gold background denotes championsSilver background denotes runners-upPink background denotes relegated

* After dropping into the competition from the Champions Cup/Heineken Cup

Player Stats

APPEARANCES

470 - Ron Jacobs (1949–66)

448 - Don White (1943–61)

438 - Vince Cannon (1973–89)

436 - Alf Chalmers (1897-1912)

426 - Tom Harris (1923–37)

TRIES

219 - Teddy Cook (1908–23)

207 - Billy Kingston (1895-1905)

185 - Barry Oldham (1964–78)

179 - Edgar Mobbs (1905–13)

178 - Frank Packman (1983–96)

POINTS

2,786 - Paul Grayson (1996-2005)

2,655 - Stephen Myler (2006-2018)

1,463 - Roger Hosen (1955–67)

1,385 - John Steele (1988–94)

1,113 - Ian Moffat (1967–74)

See also 
 English Premiership
 Heineken Cup
 LV= Cup
 European Challenge Cup
 Franklin's Gardens

Notes

References

External links 

 
 Official Supporters Website
 BBC Sport Northampton Page
 Northampton Chronicle and Echo
 Premiership Rugby Official Website

 
Premiership Rugby teams
English rugby union teams
Rugby clubs established in 1880
Rugby union in Northamptonshire
1880 establishments in England
Heineken Cup champions